Calvary Morris (January 15, 1798 – October 13, 1871) was an American politician and three term member of the United States House of Representatives from Ohio from 1837 to 1843.

Early life and career
Born in Charleston, Virginia (now West Virginia), Morris attended the common schools.  He moved to Ohio in 1819 and settled in Athens.  He was sheriff of Athens County 1823-1827.

He served as a member of the Ohio House of Representatives 1827-1829.  He served as a member of the Ohio Senate 1829-1835, and was again a member of the Ohio House of Representatives in 1835 and 1836.

Congress
Morris was elected as a Whig to the Twenty-fifth, Twenty-sixth, and Twenty-seventh Congresses (March 4, 1837 – March 3, 1843).  He served as chairman of the Committee on Invalid Pensions (Twenty-seventh Congress). He was not a candidate for renomination in 1842.

Retirement and death
Retiring from politics, Morris engaged in wool growing. In 1847, he moved to Cincinnati, Ohio, where he engaged in mercantile pursuits. He later returned to Athens and in 1854 was elected probate judge of Athens County.

Calvary Morris died in Athens, Ohio, on October 13, 1871, and was interred in Athens Cemetery.

He was a trustee of Ohio University from 1825 to 1848.

Sources

1798 births
1871 deaths
People from Athens, Ohio
Ohio sheriffs
Ohio state senators
Members of the Ohio House of Representatives
Ohio state court judges
Ohio University trustees
Whig Party members of the United States House of Representatives from Ohio
19th-century American politicians
19th-century American judges
Politicians from Charleston, West Virginia